Our Mother of Mercy Catholic School may refer to:
 Our Mother of Mercy Catholic School in Houston
 Our Mother of Mercy Catholic School (Fort Worth) in the Roman Catholic Diocese of Fort Worth
 Our Mother of Mercy Catholic School (Beaumont) in the Roman Catholic Diocese of Beaumont